Therdsak Chaiman (born 29 September 1973), simply known as Uncle Therd, is a Thai retired professional footballer who played as an attacking midfielder and later became a manager. He is the currently head coach Thai League 3 club of Pattaya Dolphins United Therdsak was a prolific goalscorer, free kick specialist, and could shoot with both feet. Therdsak also once played futsal for the Thai national team.

Club career

Therdsak is regarded as one of Southeast Asia's finest footballers. In 2002, he was loaned out to SAFFC in 2002 and proceeded to win the S.League player of the year. In 2003, Therdsak led BEC Tero Sasana to the final of the AFC Champions League against Al Ain FC in 2003. He scored against Taejon Citizen and Shanghai Shenhua in the process and was named the 2003 AFC Champions League most valuable player. In 2004, Therdsak secured a move to Vietnam's East Asia Bank but did not settle well due to a stomach muscle injury which kept him out for seven months. He promptly rejoined his former club SAFFC in 2005 despite interest from Home United Football Club. Despite his diminutive frame, Therdsak has proved to be more than capable to play with the bigwigs of international football, and at his peak, impressing many with his surging runs, vision and shot technique not often seen among footballers of his region.  Therdsak officially announced his retirement from professional football on 19 November 2017 after end of Thai League 1 season 2017 with quit of the manager job at Chonburi.

Managerial career
On 21 December 2015, Chonburi has promoted Therdsak from player-coach to be the new manager of the club after the departure of Jadet Meelarp. Therdsak made the official managerial debut on 2 February 2016 in AFC Champions League Preliminary Round 2 against Myanmar champion, Yangon United at Chonburi Stadium. Chonburi won 3–2 at the extra time. Chonburi were knocked out of the AFC competition in the final playoff by losing 0–9 to FC Tokyo from Japan.

Managerial statistics

International career

In 2002, Therdsak was instrumental for the Thailand national football team in the Tiger Cup which they won. He was awarded the Tiger Cup Most Valuable Player Award for his displays in the tournament. In June 2007, he was recalled into the national football team for the 2007 AFC Asian Cup after a lengthy absence from the team due to fatigue.

International goals

Honours

Player
BEC Tero Sasana
 Thai Premier League (2): 2000, 2001-02
 Thai FA Cup (1): 2000
 Kor Royal Cup (1): 2001

Singapore Armed Forces
 S.League (5): 2002, 2006, 2007, 2008, 2009
 Singapore Cup (2): 2007, 2008

Chonburi 
 Thai FA Cup (1): 2010
 Kor Royal Cup (2): 2011, 2012

International
Thailand
 AFF Championship (2): 2000, 2002

Individual
 AFC Champions League Most Valuable Player (1): 2002–03
 AFC Futsal Championship Top Scorers (1): 2000 
 AFF Championship Most Valuable Player (1): 2002
 Thai Premier League Player of the Month (1): May 2010

Manager
Uthai Thani
Thai League 3: 2021–22
Thai League 3 Northern Region: 2021–22

Individual
Thai League 3 Coach of the Year: 2021–22

References

External links
 Profile at Goal

1973 births
Living people
Therdsak Chaiman
Therdsak Chaiman
Association football midfielders
Therdsak Chaiman
Therdsak Chaiman
Therdsak Chaiman
Warriors FC players
Vissai Ninh Bình FC players
Therdsak Chaiman
Therdsak Chaiman
Singapore Premier League players
V.League 1 players
Therdsak Chaiman
Thai expatriate sportspeople in Singapore
Thai expatriate sportspeople in Vietnam
Expatriate footballers in Vietnam
Expatriate footballers in Singapore
Therdsak Chaiman
2000 AFC Asian Cup players
2004 AFC Asian Cup players
2007 AFC Asian Cup players
Therdsak Chaiman
Therdsak Chaiman